Cliff Whitelum (2 December 1919 – August 2000) was an English footballer who played for Sunderland as a Forward.

Club career
Whitelum made his debut for Sunderland on 25 January 1939 against Blackpool in a 1–1 draw at Bloomfield Road. Overall, during his Sunderland career spanning from 1939 to 1947, in a stay interrupted largely by the Second World War, made 50 league appearances scoring 19 goals.

References

1919 births
English footballers
Sunderland A.F.C. players
People from Farnworth
2000 deaths
Association football forwards